Youssof Kohzad (Persian: يوسف كهزاد; also spelled Youssef Kohzad) (born 1935) was an ethnic Tajik writer, painter, playwright, artist, poet, actor, and art consultant from Afghanistan.  He has now taken residence in Tracy, California, United States since his emigration from Afghanistan. He is married to Zakia Kohzad.

Background 

Youssef Kohzad was born in 1935 in the Chendawol district of Kabul, Afghanistan. During his high school years, he wrote plays and created artwork for Kabul Theater. Kohzad graduated from Nejat (Amani) High School in Kabul in 1953. He finished his formal art education from the Academy of Art in Rome, Italy in 1965. After returning from Italy, he traveled to the former Soviet Union, India and former Eastern Germany to exhibit his art along with other contemporary Afghan artists. Many of his works are showcased in the Middle Eastern Studies museums in Moscow.

From 1966-1969 he held executive positions at the Ministry of Media and Culture, in which he was the head of the Fine Arts Department.

In 1971, he became the art consultant of Kabul Theater. He wrote eight dramas and all were played on stage. In many of the plays, he played the lead role.

In 1975, he returned to the Ministry of Media and Culture and held the position of president of the ministry until 1992.

In 1976, he founded the National Gallery in Kabul, which included 700 paintings, and some work dating back a hundred years. Unfortunately, out of the 700 works of art, only 30 remain today.

From 1992 until August 2000, Kohzad became a refugee along with his family and was forced to immigrate to India. In August 2000, he moved to the United States and has been residing in Northern California since then. His first art exhibit in the United States was held in August 2001 in Palo Alto.

Education 

 1965: Academy of Art (Rome, Italy)

Online Poems 

Black Pearls

Works 
 Mojasema Ha May Khandand (1975) as an actor
Aspects of Beauty in Art
Kohzad: A collection of Poetry
When God Created Beauty

References 
CBS Radio Network.  Afghan Art in Exile.  February 4, 2002.
Youssef Kohzad Profile: 

Afghan male actors
Afghan expatriates in India
Afghan expatriates in Italy
Afghan emigrants to the United States
Afghan novelists
20th-century Afghan poets
Tajik poets
20th-century Persian-language writers
People from Kabul
1935 births
Living people
20th-century Afghan male actors
Afghan refugees
20th-century Afghan writers
21st-century Afghan writers